Quirindi Herald and District News was an English language newspaper published from 1905 to 1925 in Quirindi, 346 km (215 mi) NNW of Sydney, New South Wales, Australia.

Newspaper history
Quirindi Herald and District News was preceded by Quirindi Magpie, which was published from before 3 January 1899 (vol. 1, no. 45) until 30 May 1905 (vol. 7, no. 664). Also in publication before Quirindi Herald and District News was Quirindi Gazette and Liverpool Plains Advocate, which was published from 1885, although this title continued until 1925. On 3 July 1925, the Quirindi Advocate came into being and continues to this day.

Digitisation
Quirindi Herald and District News has been digitised as part of the Australian Newspapers Digitisation Program hosted by the National Library of Australia.

See also
List of newspapers in New South Wales
List of newspapers in Australia

References

External links

Defunct newspapers published in New South Wales